City of Fear  is a 1959 American film noir directed by Irving Lerner.

Synopsis
Vince, an escaped convict from San Quentin headed for Los Angeles, has a canister in his possession that he thinks has heroin inside of it. It does not; instead, it contains Cobalt-60, a dangerous nuclear substance with enough radiation to kill most of the population of Los Angeles. As continued exposure to the element is slowly killing Vince, authorities move to capture him and the canister.

Cast
 Vince Edwards as Vince Ryker
 Lyle Talbot as Chief Jensen
 John Archer as Lt. Mark Richards
 Steven Ritch as Dr. John Wallace
 Patricia Blair as	June Marlowe
 Kelly Thordsen as Detective Sgt. Hank Johnson
 Joseph Mell as Eddie Crown
 Sherwood Price as Pete Hallon
 Kathie Browne as Jeanne (as Cathy Browne)

Shown on the Turner Classic Movies show 'Noir Alley' with Eddie Muller on November 5, 2022.

External links
 
 
 City of Fear at Turner Classic Movies

1959 films
American black-and-white films
Columbia Pictures films
1959 crime drama films
Film noir
Films directed by Irving Lerner
American crime drama films
1950s English-language films
1950s American films